William J. Murray (c. 1884 – August 20, 1966) was an American politician from New York. He was born in 1884 to Samuel J. Murray and Anna E. (Reilly) Murray. His father was a successful businessman and inventor, who made his mark on the United States Playing Card Company.

Biography
Murray was a member of the New York State Senate (14th D.) from 1937 to 1944, sitting in the 160th, 161st, 162nd, 163rd and 164th New York State Legislatures.

Personal
William J. Murray was married to Anna Marie Ahearn, who was the daughter of Senator John F. Ahearn of New York.  They had two children: Samuel J. Murray (December 7, 1918 - April 28, 2004) and John A. Murray (May 5, 1923 - March 5, 2009).  Samuel J. Murray was named Special Assistant State Attorney General and Sr. Asst. Counsel, NY State Crime Commission by Gov. Thomas E. Dewey.  John A. Murray was an attorney for the New York City Transit Authority.

William J. Murray died on August 20, 1966, in St. Vincent's Hospital in Manhattan.

Sources

1880s births
1966 deaths
Democratic Party New York (state) state senators
People from New York City
20th-century American politicians